The USC Marshall School of Business is a private research and academic institution at the University of Southern California. It is located in downtown Los Angeles, California.

"The mission of the school is to deepen the knowledge and understanding of the critical problems faced in business, and to educate tomorrow's leaders who will address them."

Online Programs 

 Online MBA
 Master of Business Taxation For Working Professionals
 Master of Science in Global Supply Chain Management
 Master of Science Food Industry Leadership

Many of the courses offered are qualified for continuing education credits.

Facilities 
USC has three on-site learning centers:

 Popovich Hall  Opened in 1999.

 Experiential Learning Center (ELC) 

 Davidson Executive Conference Center  The Davidson Conference Center features six meeting rooms accompanied by break-out rooms. The Center also provides complete audio/video services, computer terminals, and a teleconferencing link.

References

External links 
 

University of Southern California
Business schools in California
1951 establishments in California
Educational institutions established in 1951